2001: A Space Odyssey is a 1968 science fiction novel written by Arthur C. Clarke and the 1968 film directed by Stanley Kubrick. It is a part of Clarke's Space Odyssey series, the first of four novels and two films. Both the novel and the film are partially based on Clarke's 1948 short story "The Sentinel", an entry in a BBC short story competition, and "Encounter in the Dawn", published in 1953 in the magazine Amazing Stories.

Resources 
After deciding on Clarke's 1948 short story "The Sentinel" as the starting point, and with the themes of man's relationship with the universe in mind, Clarke sold Kubrick five more of his stories to use as background materials for the film. These included "Breaking Strain", "Out of the Cradle, Endlessly Orbiting...", "Who's There?", "Into the Comet", and "Before Eden". Additionally, important elements from two more Clarke stories, "Encounter in the Dawn" and (to a somewhat lesser extent) "Rescue Party", made their way into the finished project.

Film

The film was written by Clarke and Kubrick and featured specialist artwork by Roy Carnon.

Score

Novel

Arthur C. Clarke wrote the novel. He developed it concurrently with the film version and published it in 1968, after the film's release. The Lost Worlds of 2001 (1972) elaborates on Clarke and Kubrick's collaboration.

Comics

The Space Odyssey series

References

 2001: A Space Odyssey: Dodiyo

hard science fiction
Space Odyssey